General Mason may refer to:

Arthur T. Mason (1902–1980), U.S. Marine Corps brigadier general
Guillermo Suárez Mason (1924–2005), Argentine general
James Mason (Canadian politician) (1843–1918), Canadian-born British Army brigadier general
John Mason (planter) (1766–1849), District of Columbia militia brigadier general
John S. Mason (1824–1897), Union Army brigadier general
Richard Barnes Mason (1797–1850), U.S. Army brevet brigadier general
Samson Mason (1793–1869), Ohio State Militia major general

See also
Noel Mason-MacFarlane (1889–1953), British Army lieutenant general
Attorney General Mason (disambiguation)